Philipp Hercher (born 21 March 1996) is a German professional footballer who plays as a right-back for 1. FC Kaiserslautern.

Club career 
Hercher is a youth exponent from 1. FC Nürnberg. He made his 2. Bundesliga debut on 29 November 2015 against FC St. Pauli replacing Tim Leibold after 88 minutes in a 4–0 away win.

References

Living people
1996 births
People from Rheinfelden (Baden)
Sportspeople from Freiburg (region)
Association football fullbacks
German footballers
2. Bundesliga players
3. Liga players
1. FC Nürnberg II players
1. FC Nürnberg players
VfR Aalen players
SG Sonnenhof Großaspach players
1. FC Kaiserslautern players
Footballers from Baden-Württemberg